Kondhej is a village in the Karmala taluka of Solapur district in Maharashtra state, India.

Demographics
Covering  and comprising 527 households at the time of the 2011 census of India, Kondhej had a population of 2347. There were 1201 males and 1146 females, with 283 people being aged six or younger.

References

Villages in Karmala taluka